The Bellingham Blazers are an Amateur Athletic Union-sanctioned Tier II junior ice hockey team in the United States Premier Hockey League. The Blazers are based in Bellingham, Washington and play home games at the Bellingham Sportsplex.

History
From 2012 to 2016, the Blazers played in the Northern Pacific Hockey League (NorPac/NPHL). In their first two seasons, the Blazers captured the Cascade Cup, awarded to the league playoff champions, and earned a spot in the USA National Tier III Championships. In 2013, coach Mark Collins was also awarded Coach of the Year when the Blazers won their first Cascade Cup. Collins was fired from team before the 2019 playoffs.

In 2016, the team left the NPHL and USA Hockey-sanctioning with the intentions of joining the Amateur Athletic Union-sanctioned Western States Hockey League.

Season-by-season records

Tier III Junior Hockey National Championship
The Bellingham Blazers qualified for the Tier III Junior Hockey National Championships in 2013 and 2014 by winning their league playoff championship. The Blazers have never past the round-robin stage of the tournament.

Round-robin play in pool with top four overall teams advancing to the semifinal.

References

External links
Team Website

2012 establishments in Washington (state)
Bellingham, Washington
Ice hockey teams in Washington (state)
Ice hockey clubs established in 2012